Abdula Musayevich Bagamayev (born 18 October 2004) is a Russian footballer who plays as a midfielder for Lokomotiv Moscow.

Club career
Bagamayev made his debut in the Russian Premier League for Lokomotiv Moscow on 28 August 2022 in a game against FC Orenburg.

Career statistics

References

External links
 
 
 
 

Living people
2004 births
People from Tyumen
Sportspeople from Tyumen Oblast
Russian footballers
Association football midfielders
Russian Premier League players
FC Lokomotiv Moscow players